Vernon George Samuels (born 5 October 1964) is a retired British athlete. He competed in the men's triple jump at the 1988 Summer Olympics. He represented England in the triple jump event, at the 1990 Commonwealth Games in Auckland, New Zealand.

References

External links
 

1964 births
Living people
Athletes (track and field) at the 1988 Summer Olympics
British male triple jumpers
Olympic athletes of Great Britain
Athletes (track and field) at the 1990 Commonwealth Games
Commonwealth Games competitors for England